The Windsor Symphony Orchestra is a Canadian orchestra located in Windsor, Ontario.  The orchestra performs in South Western Ontario, playing both classical and popular music.

History
The Windsor Symphony Orchestra was founded in 1941, originally as the Windsor Concert Orchestra.  The name was changed to The Windsor Symphony in 1948. The first conductor was Matti Holli, who remained with the orchestra until his death in 1977. From 1977 to 1979 Clifford Evens served as interim conductor and artistic adviser. Laszlo Gati was music director from 1979 to 1985 and is credited with raising the level of the orchestra and consolidating community support.

The most recent Canadian conductor to be appointed music director was Dwight Bennett in 1986. Under Bennett, the orchestra became fully professional but also ran into financial difficulties through unrealized revenue projections and a musician's strike in 1988. He was succeeded by American conductor Susan Haig in 1991. Music director from 2001 to 2012 was American conductor John Morris Russell. During his tenure the orchestra received several awards including two Ontario Lieutenant Governor's awards for the arts. He conducted his last concert as music director on May 12, 2012.

On Feb. 26, 2013, the Windsor Symphony Orchestra announced the appointment of Robert Franz as their sixth music director. Franz is the third American conductor in a row to be appointed to the position.  He was chosen from seven other candidates, which were fellow Americans Laura Jackson, Steven Jarvi, Kevin Rhodes and Scott Speck; Irish conductor Kevin Mallon; Canadian Erik Paetkau and Romanian Cristian Macelaru.
 
The Windsor Symphony Orchestra performs at several venues in the Windsor-Essex County area but, since the beginning of the 2012–2013 season, is based at the historic Capitol Theatre in downtown Windsor, a restored former movie house.  Several concerts, mainly for smaller ensembles and the orchestra's Chorus, are performed annually at the University of Windsor's Assumption University Chapel.

Music directors

Current leadership

Peter Wiebe
Assistant conductor Peter Wiebe was named Windsor Symphony Youth Orchestra (WSYO) Conductor and Assistant Conductor in January 2005. Wiebe has played cello in the Windsor Symphony Orchestra's core since 1987. He has also served the WSO at different times as principal and assistant principal cellist, education co-coordinator, concert host, chorusmaster, operations manager, arranger and composer.

Concerts and programs

Main stage
Annually, the Windsor Symphony Orchestra stages 4 to 5 programmes with full orchestra in its Masterworks series and 4 to 5 Pops programmes, each performed at the historic Capitol Theatre in Windsor. The WSO also has 4 to 5 chamber orchestra programmes in its Intimate Classics Series performed in Windsor, Leamington and Tecumseh, Ontario.

Chorus
The Windsor Symphony Orchestra Chorus was created in 1988 as a choral group directly affiliated with the orchestra.  Previously, the orchestra would perform alongside the Windsor Classic Chorale and groups from Windsor and Leamington.  The Chorus, which is volunteer and by audition, performs several concerts throughout the season at the Capitol Theatre as well as at UW Assumption University Chapel, covering classical as well as contemporary and pop music.  The current chorusmaster is Bruce Kotowich.

New Music
The Windsor Canadian Music Festival is an annual celebration of new orchestral music with a focus on Canadian composers and performers.  The WSO collaborates with the University of Windsor, School of Music to showcase up and coming composers and explore the newest trends in musical expression.

Community outreach
Community Outreach concerts feature the WSO chamber orchestra and regional soloists in programmes designed for small venues, to help hosting organizations raise funds for a special cause. Gift of Music concerts are performed by string or woodwind ensembles for social service agencies, nursing/retirement homes and non-profit organizations throughout Windsor/Essex County.

Education initiatives

Music Alive
The Music Alive concert series involves small percussion, woodwind, brass, and string ensembles, which perform at schools in Windsor/Essex County.  Programming is age-specific and designed to correspond with the Ontario school curriculum with the intent of enhancing learning through the arts.

Education Concert Series
The Education Concert Series consists of three concert programmes designed kindergarten to grade three; grades four to six, and grades seven to twelve. The concerts are developed to be interactive and often feature young performers as soloists. Tied specifically to The Ontario Curriculum Grades 1-8: The Arts, 1998, concert themes are: language, social studies, geography, science, and math.

One-Community – One Symphony
The One-Community – One Symphony Project began in 2008, as a season long exploration of a single major symphonic work with high school bands and choirs from Windsor/Essex. The biennial project includes the participation of 10-12 high school bands and choruses representing French, Catholic and Public School Boards. Students rehearse and perform arrangements of the work as part of their regular school music program, with additional master-classes and rehearsals with Maestro Russell. The project culminates with a shared performance with the Windsor Symphony Orchestra.

Peanut Butter n' Jam
The WSO's Peanut Butter n' Jam concert series is an interactive and engaging introduction to music for young children ages 2–6 and their families. Music hosts guide children in exploration of classic melodies, orchestral families, traditional songs, art, story telling and magic. PB n' J concerts are offered at three different locations in Windsor at a variety of times.

Windsor Symphony Youth Orchestra
Created in 2004, the Windsor Symphony Youth Orchestra (WSYO) rehearses and performs orchestral music under professional direction. Students (ages 12–20) audition for membership. The WSYO performs 3-5 concerts annually including Side-by-Side performance with the Windsor Symphony Orchestra.

Music Therapy
The Music Therapy program is a partnership between the WSO, University of Windsor Music Therapy program, Windsor Regional Hospital, and Transition to Betterness.  University of Windsor Music Therapy students perform alongside WSO musicians at Windsor Regional Hospital, visiting patients.

Awards and accolades
 2010 – Windsor Endowment for the Arts (WEA) Award to Arts Organizations given to the Armouries Redevelopment Committee; WEA Arts Leadership Award for Performing Arts to John Morris Russell; Herb Gray Harmony Award to John Morris Russell in recognition of the WSO's programming and outreach activities that consistently support and celebrate the region's cultural diversity; A recording by CBC Radio 2 of the Windsor Canadian Music Festival performance by the WSO of composer Jordan Nobles' work Aurora Borealis selected to represent Canada at the International Rostrum of Composers in Lisbon.
 2008 – Juno Award nomination for the recording of Peter and the Wolf & Last Minute Lulu; Orchestras Canada Betty Webster Award presented to persons who, over the long term, make a difference in the Canadian orchestral community, given to former Executive Director Mina Grossman Ianni.
 2007 – Vide Peene Fund Orchestra Award 
 2006 – 5 out of 5 stars from Rick Phillips, CBC's Sound Advice for Peter and the Wolf & Last Minute Lulu
 2004 – Gold World medal, New York Festivals Awards for Television and New Media
 2004 – Gemini Award nomination for performance on CBC's Opening Night
 2001 & 2003 – Ontario Lieutenant-Governor's Award for the Arts

Discography
Peter and the Wolf and Last Minute Lulu – John Morris Russell conductor, 2006. With narration by Colm Feore and Christopher Paul Curtis. Composition by Prokofiev and Brent Lee.
Mozart Symphony No. 33, The Magic Flute Overture, Vorrei spiegarvi, Haydn: Symphony No. 82: Susan Haig conductor, Windsor Symphony Singers, 1999
 Rudy Plays Rachmaninoff, WSO, Laszlo Gati conducting, Michael Rudy, piano. Rachmaninov Piano Concerto No. 3, Op. 30

World premieres
The Windsor Symphony Orchestra has presented over 40 World Premieres since 2001. This includes 29 works commissioned by the WSO (made possible through a grant by Canada Council for the Arts).

See also
 List of symphony orchestras
 Canadian classical music

References

External links
 Windsor Symphony Orchestra Official website
 Canadian Encyclopedia: Windsor Symphony Orchestra
 One Community, One Symphony – the Windsor Symphony, that is

Musical groups established in 1941
Musical groups from Windsor, Ontario
Canadian orchestras
1941 establishments in Ontario